With the success of Styx's album The Grand Illusion, Wooden Nickel Records, Styx's previous label, released Best of Styx, which contained selected Styx songs in the Wooden Nickel catalog. Styx had left Wooden Nickel to sign with A&M Records several years earlier, so the compilation does not contain any songs from Styx's three A&M albums that preceded this album's release. "Lady", "You Need Love" and "Best Thing" are the principal songs that could be classified as hits in this collection, having charted at numbers 6, 88 and 82 on the Billboard Hot 100, respectively; the remainder of the songs are selected album tracks from Styx's Wooden Nickel releases.

RCA Records reissued the album with new artwork in 1979; this artwork has been used for all subsequent reissues, including CD editions.

In 1980, Wooden Nickel released the compilation Lady, containing the same tracks as this set (in a different running order), minus the song "Winner Take All".

Track listing
"You Need Love" (DeYoung) – 3:44
"Lady" (DeYoung) – 2:56
"I'm Gonna Make You Feel It" (DeYoung) – 2:23
"What Has Come Between Us" (Mark Gaddis) – 4:53
"Southern Woman" (J. Young, R. Brandle) – 3:10
"Rock & Roll Feeling" (J. Young, J. Curulewski) – 3:02
"Winner Take All" (D. DeYoung, C. Lofrano) – 3:10
"Best Thing" (James Young, Dennis DeYoung) – 3:13
"Witch Wolf" (J. Young-R. Brandle) – 3:57
"The Grove of Eglantine" (DeYoung) – 5:00
"Man of Miracles" (J. Young, D. DeYoung, R. Brandle) – 4:55

Personnel
Dennis DeYoung - keyboards, vocals
James Young - guitar, vocals
John Curulewski - guitar, keyboards, vocals
Chuck Panozzo - bass
John Panozzo -  drums

References

1977 compilation albums
Styx (band) compilation albums